O dialecto crioulo de Cabo Verde (Portuguese meaning "The Creole Dialect from Cape Verde" or "The Creole Dialect of Cape Verde") is a Capeverdean book published in 1957 by Baltasar Lopes da Silva.  As the title was the spelling used after the 1945 Portuguese Orthography Agreement, its modern spelling is titled O Dialeto Crioulo de Cabo Verde.

The book is a description of the Cape Verdean Creole including the grammar, the phonology and the lexicon. Despite not being up to date, it is still one of the best references for Cape Verdean Creole,  the other being made by Armando Napoleão Rodrigues Fernandes published later in 1969 titled O dialecto crioulo — Léxico do dialecto crioulo do Arquipélago de Cabo Verde (Modern form: O Dialeto Crioulo - Léxico do Dialeto do Arquipélago de Cabo Verde) being the first dictionary in Cape Verdean Creole.

Editions

Transliterations
Its translations of names in Cape Verdean Creoles include:
ALUPEK: U dialektu kriolu di Kauberdi
Fogo Creole: O dialetu krioulu di Kaberdi
São Vicente Creole:
pre-2015: O dialekt' kriol' de Kauberd'''
Modern: O dialekt kriol de Kauberde''

References

1957 non-fiction books
Cape Verdean Creole
Linguistics books